The List of settlements in the Federation of Bosnia and Herzegovina is split into a separate page for each initial letter.

See also 

 List of populated places in Bosnia and Herzegovina
 List of cities in Bosnia and Herzegovina
 Municipalities of Bosnia and Herzegovina
 Municipalities of Republika Srpska